Lavender is an unincorporated community in Floyd County, in the U.S. state of Georgia.

History
A post office called Lavender was established in 1889, and remained in operation until it was discontinued in 1910. The community was named for George Michael Lavender, who kept a store there.

References

Unincorporated communities in Floyd County, Georgia
Unincorporated communities in Georgia (U.S. state)